"hang ten" is a nickname for any of several maneuvers used in sports, especially surfing, wherein all ten toes or fingers are used to accomplish the maneuver.

 surfing: the surfer stands and hangs all their toes over the nose of the board. Usually this can only be done on a heavy longboard. 
 basketball: the basketball player dunks the ball and hangs onto the hoop.
 BMX: a flatland move.
 Jiu Jitsu: any of an infinite number, of grips, chokes, escapes, or maneuvers where play involves all toes touching the mat or all ten fingers gripping Gi or swimming to some void somewhere to create or escape a dominant position. Gripping Gi
 skateboarding: a nose manual named after the surfing maneuver.

See also 
 hang loose
 nose ride
 glossary of surfing

References 

surfing terminology